Bărcănești is a commune in Prahova County, Muntenia, Romania. It is composed of five villages: Bărcănești, Ghighiu, Pușcași, Românești and Tătărani.

References

Communes in Prahova County
Localities in Muntenia